Corporal Trustrim Connell (May 12, 1844 to February 17, 1937) was an American soldier who fought in the American Civil War. Connell received the country's highest award for bravery during combat, the Medal of Honor, for his action during the Battle of Sayler's Creek in Virginia on 6 April 1865. He was honored with the award on 10 May 1865.

Biography
Connell was born in Lancaster, Pennsylvania on 12 May 1844. He enlisted into the 138th Pennsylvania Infantry. He died on 17 February 1937 and his remains are interred at the Angelus Rosedale Cemetery in Los Angeles.

Medal of Honor citation

See also

List of American Civil War Medal of Honor recipients: A–F

References

1844 births
1937 deaths
People of Pennsylvania in the American Civil War
Union Army officers
United States Army Medal of Honor recipients
American Civil War recipients of the Medal of Honor
People from Lancaster, Pennsylvania
Burials at Angelus-Rosedale Cemetery